Al-Mustaqbal Al-Mushriq Sport Club, is an Iraqi football team based in Nineveh, that plays in Iraq Division Two.

Managerial history
 Ali Zuhair

See also 
 2021–22 Iraq FA Cup

References

External links
 Al-Mustaqbal Al-Mushriq SC on Goalzz.com
 Iraq Clubs- Foundation Dates

2005 establishments in Iraq
Association football clubs established in 2005
Football clubs in Nineveh